Leonard Franklin Hill (October 11, 1947 – June 7, 2016) was an American television producer and property developer. Hill began his career as a television writer, writing scripts for numerous shows, including Adam-12, an NBC police drama. He then became a television executive, serving first at NBC before becoming Vice President of Movies at ABC. Hill produced four television miniseries, dozens of television movies and three drama series during his tenures at NBC and ABC. His television movies were mostly distributed by Pearson Television, who was once successor of ACI.

The popularity of television films had waned by the early 2000s, which prompted a career change by Hill. In 2001, switched to real estate development, with a focus on downtown Los Angeles and adaptive reuse. Hill partnered with Yuval Bar-Zemer, a developer with a history of reuse, to establish Linear City Development. Together, Hill and Bar-Zemer instigated numerous projects within the city's Arts District, on the eastern edge of Downtown Los Angeles by transforming existing buildings into new housing and developments. Hill's projects included the Toy Factory Lofts, which were finished in 2004, the nearby Biscuit Company Lofts, and the Elysian, which transformed the former headquarters of the Metropolitan Water District of Southern California into residential building containing loft apartments near Echo Park in 2014.

In 2016, Hill donated $1.9 million to create a new public park under the newly constructed Sixth Street Bridge. It was announced that the new park will be named in Hill's honor, following his death in 2016.

Leonard Hill was born in Westwood, Los Angeles, on October 11, 1947, to Edith Hill, a social worker, and Herbert Hill, a businessman. He attended University High School and received his bachelor's degree from Yale University and his master's degree from Stanford University.

Hill died at his home in Hancock Park, Los Angeles, on June 7, 2016, at the age of 68. He was survived by his second wife, Dr. Patricia Gordon, whom he married in 2011, and two brothers, Andrew Hill and Rick Hill.

References

External links

1947 births
2016 deaths
American television executives
American television writers
American real estate businesspeople
Deaths from brain cancer in the United States
Deaths from cancer in California
Neurological disease deaths in California
People from Los Angeles
Screenwriters from California
Stanford University alumni
Television producers from California
Yale University alumni
20th-century American philanthropists